Mansi Wakal is a dam on the Mansi River in Udaipur district, Rajasthan, India. 

Located approximately 7 kilometres north of the village of Jhadol, the dam forms a reservoir which can hold about 24.4 million cubic metres of water. The reservoir primarily provides drinking water to the city of Udaipur, accounting for 23% of the city's drinking water supply. Additionally, the reservoir supplies drinking water to rural areas of Udaipur district and water for industrial uses to Hindustan Zinc. 

Mansi Wakal dam is part of an inter-basin transfer scheme called 'Mansi Wakal I' under which water is transferred from the Sabarmati basin to the Bherach basin. Some local groups opposed the construction of the dam.

References

Udaipur district
Interbasin transfer
Dams in Rajasthan
Dams in Sabarmati River basin
Dams completed in 2005
2005 establishments in Rajasthan